NSNA may refer to:
 National Student Nurses' Association, a U.S. nonprofit organization
 Never Say Never Again, a James Bond film